Hsu Chi-hung (born 22 June 1992) is a Taiwanese baseball infielder for the CTBC Brothers of the Chinese Professional Baseball League (CPBL). He was drafted by the Brothers in 2014 and won Rookie of the Year honors in 2015.

Hsu represented Taiwan at the 2004 Little League World Series, 2013 World Port Tournament, 2013 World Baseball Challenge, 2013 East Asian Games and 2017 World Baseball Classic.

Hsu signed with the Brisbane Bandits of the Australian Baseball League for the 2018/19 season.

References

1992 births
Living people
2017 World Baseball Classic players
Baseball players from Kaohsiung
Baseball infielders
CTBC Brothers players
Brisbane Bandits players
Taiwanese expatriate baseball players in Australia